Eli C. King was an American politician who was the third mayor of Columbus, Ohio.   He served Columbus for three terms.  His successor was John Laughrey.

References

Bibliography

External links
Eli C. King at Political Graveyard

Mayors of Columbus, Ohio
Year of birth missing
Year of death missing
19th-century American politicians